Yamazaki Gakuen University,   is a private university in Hachioji, Tokyo, Japan. It was established in 2009.

External links 
 Official website in Japanese

Private universities and colleges in Japan
Educational institutions established in 2004
Universities and colleges in Tokyo
Western Metropolitan Area University Association
2004 establishments in Japan